Murder for Hire 2 is the fourteenth mixtape by American rapper Kevin Gates. It was released on May 27, 2016, by his own independent record label Bread Winners' Association and Atlantic Records. Unlike his other mixtapes, that were released for free and for retail, this mixtape was strictly for retail purposes only.

Release
Kevin Gates wants to release another studio album but Atlantic Records said that they didn't allow him to release another studio album until February 2017 so he announced the sequel to Murder For Hire. The mixtape is available to stream on Spotify and Apple Music but not currently available on DatPiff.

Songs
The mixtape contains 8 songs. The opening track, Fuck It contain sample of Cut It from American rapper O.T. Genasis. OG Boobie Black is the only feature of the mixtape.

Commercial performance 
Murder For Hire 2 debuted at number 12 on the US Billboard 200, with 27,000 album-equivalent units; it sold 20,000 copies in its first week, and boasted over 7.3 million streams.

Track list

Sample credits
"Fuck It" contains samples of "Cut It, performed by O.T. Genasis.

Charts

Weekly charts

Year-end charts

References

2016 mixtape albums
Kevin Gates albums
Sequel albums